The following is a list of events and releases that have happened or are expected to happen in 2023 in music in the Philippines.

Notable events
 February 12 – Jeromy Batac, Marcus Cabais, Kyler Chua, Vinci Malizon, Reyster Yton, Kim Ng, and Winston Pineda were named as the Top 7 aspirants of the Filipino-South Korean reality show Dream Maker. They will set to debut as a group named HORI7ON in South Korea.

Debuting acts

Bands

Solo artists

Reunion/Comebacks
The Dawn

Released in 2023

First quarter

January

February

March

Concerts and music festivals

Most of the shows this year were supposed to be held in 2020, but postponed due to the COVID-19 pandemic.

Local artists

International artists

Music festivals

Deaths
 January 29 – Dennis Fabunan (b. 1981), Maria Cafra bassist
 February 9 – Ytram Pacson (b. 1997), TV Host, Actress and INC Production Company Singer (Clarity)

References

Philippines
2023 in the Philippines
Philippine music industry